The Daka River is a river of Ghana. It flows through the northeastern part of the country and is one of the tributaries of the Lake Volta. The land between the Daka and Oti rivers is known as the Oti-Daka corridor.

References

Rivers of Ghana